Rocklin is a city in Placer County, California, about  from Sacramento, and about  northeast of Roseville in the Sacramento metropolitan area. Besides Roseville, it shares borders with Granite Bay, Loomis and Lincoln. As of the 2010 census, Rocklin's population was 56,974. The California Department of Finance placed the 2019 population at 68,823.

History
Before the California Gold Rush, the Nisenan Maidu occupied both permanent villages and temporary summer shelters along the rivers and streams that miners sifted, sluiced, dredged and dammed to remove the gold. Explorer Jedediah Smith and a large party of American fur trappers crossed the Sacramento Valley in April 1827. The group saw many Maidu villages along the river banks. Deprived of traditional foodstuffs, homesites and hunting grounds by the emigrants, the Nisenan were among the earliest California Indian tribes to disappear.

During the 1850s, miners sluiced streams and rivers, including Secret Ravine, which runs through Rocklin. The piles of dredger tailings are still obvious today, between Roseville and Loomis southeast of Interstate 80. Secret Ravine, at the area now at the intersection of Ruhkala Road and Pacific Street, was later mined for granite, some of which was used as the base course of the California Capitol Building; the earliest recorded use of the rock was for Fort Mason at San Francisco in 1855. The granite was hauled out by oxcarts before the arrival of the railroad many years later.

In 1860, the U.S. Census counted 440 residents in the area of Secret Ravine, of whom about 16% had been born in Ireland and the majority of whom worked as miners. The area was referred to as Secret Ravine or the "granite quarries at the end of the tracks" as late as 1864.

Rocklin's history is closely tied to the transcontinental railroad. In 1862, the Pacific Railroad Act granted the Central Pacific Railroad land near Secret Ravine. In 1864, the Central Pacific Railroad completed an extension of its track southwest from Newcastle to Secret Ravine. It named the area Rocklin after its granite quarry and used the site as a refueling and water stop. The Central Pacific built a roundhouse in 1867. The transcontinental railroad was completed in 1869, significantly increasing railroad traffic through the town. According to the 1870 census, Rocklin had grown to 542 residents, and the majority of Irish immigrants had forgone mining and were working for the railroad. In 1908, the Central Pacific moved its facility from Rocklin to Roseville, where more land was available for expansion. The Roseville site has remained in continuous use since. As of August 2014, it is the largest rail facility near the U.S. West Coast.

In 1869, a group of laid-off Chinese railroad workers moved to Secret Ravine to mine and raise vegetables which they sold locally. The Chinese community was violently driven out in September 1876 after a group of Chinese was falsely accused of murdering three people near Rocklin. The area was still known as China Gardens as of 1974.

The Rocklin post office opened in 1868. Finnish immigrants settled in Rocklin starting in the 1870s, and Spanish settlers arriving by way of Hawaii settled in Rocklin in the early 20th century. The town incorporated in 1893.

Geography

Climate
Rocklin has a hot-summer Mediterranean climate (Köppen Csa), characterized by cool, wet winters and hot, dry summers. Rocklin very rarely sees any snow accumulation. The degree of diurnal temperature variation varies greatly depending on time of year. It ranges from only 14 °F in January to 33 °F in July.

Demographics

2019
The California Department of Finance calculated the population of Rocklin at 69,249 with a 3.8% population growth over 2018.

2010
At the 2010 census Rocklin had a population of 56,974. The racial makeup of Rocklin was 47,047 (82.6%) White, 858 (1.5%) African American, 410 (0.7%) Native American, 4,105 (7.2%) Asian, 150 (0.3%) Pacific Islander, 1,538 (2.7%) from other races, and 2,866 (5.0%) from two or more races. Hispanic or Latino of any race were 6,555 persons (11.5%).

The census reported that 56,337 people (98.9% of the population) lived in households, 456 (0.8%) lived in non-institutionalized group quarters, and 181 (0.3%) were institutionalized.

There were 20,800 households, 8,424 (40.5%) had children under the age of 18 living in them, 11,974 (57.6%) were opposite-sex married couples living together, 2,191 (10.5%) had a female householder with no husband present, 895 (4.3%) had a male householder with no wife present.  There were 1,035 (5.0%) unmarried opposite-sex partnerships, and 124 (0.6%) same-sex married couples or partnerships. 4,403 households (21.2%) were one person and 1,652 (7.9%) had someone living alone who was 65 or older. The average household size was 2.71.  There were 15,060 families (72.4% of households); the average family size was 3.18.

The age distribution was 15,613 people (27.4%) under the age of 18, 5,306 people (9.3%) aged 18 to 24, 15,159 people (26.6%) aged 25 to 44, 14,668 people (25.7%) aged 45 to 64, and 6,228 people (10.9%) who were 65 or older.  The median age was 36.7 years. For every 100 females, there were 94.0 males.  For every 100 females age 18 and over, there were 90.4 males.

There were 22,010 housing units at an average density of 1,123.3 per square mile, of the occupied units 13,797 (66.3%) were owner-occupied and 7,003 (33.7%) were rented. The homeowner vacancy rate was 2.5%; the rental vacancy rate was 7.3%.  39,295 people (69.0% of the population) lived in owner-occupied housing units and 17,042 people (29.9%) lived in rental housing units.

2000
At the 2000 census there were 36,330 people in 13,258 households, including 10,009 families, in the city. The racial makeup of the city was 88.32% White, 0.91% African American, 0.80% Native American, 4.16% Asian, 0.19% Pacific Islander, 1.93% from other races, and 3.69% from two or more races. Hispanic or Latino of any race were 7.91%. 16.8% were of German, 11.8% English, 10.6% Irish, 8.1% Italian and 6.5% American ancestry according to Census 2000.

Of the 13,258 households 42.6% had children under the age of 18 living with them, 62.3% were married couples living together, 9.4% had a female householder with no husband present, and 24.5% were non-families. 18.7% of households were one person and 6.3% were one person aged 65 or older. The average household size was 2.74 and the average family size was 3.15.

The age distribution was 30.0% under the age of 18, 7.0% from 18 to 24, 33.7% from 25 to 44, 20.8% from 45 to 64, and 8.6% 65 or older. The median age was 34 years. For every 100 females, there were 95.6 males. For every 100 females age 18 and over, there were 92.6 males.

The median income for a household in the city was $79,274, according to the City of Rocklin website. Males had a median income of $54,426 versus $35,920 for females. The per capita income for the city was $26,910. About 3.1% of families and 4.5% of the population were below the poverty line, including 4.3% of those under age 18 and 3.5% of those age 65 or over.

Economy
Granite mining ended in 2004 in Rocklin. Top Rocklin employers include large multinational corporations, retail outlets, education and government. As of April 2016, Rocklin had an estimated civilian work force of 30,100 with an unemployment rate of 4.4%. Approximately 40% of Rocklin citizens over age 25 hold a bachelor's degree or higher.

Shopping, entertainment and dining can be found in the Blue Oaks Town Center, a regional shopping center anchored by national tenants on the Highway 65 corridor, as well as Rocklin Commons and Rocklin Crossings with tenants that include Target, Walmart, and Bass Pro Shop, along Interstate 80. A section of Granite Drive along Interstate 80 known as Toy Row has high-end auto dealerships, RV and Boat retailers, and a local antique mall.

The city has four districts with distinct architectural guidelines: the University District, Granite District, College District, and Quarry District.

Education

The Rocklin area is home to 13 elementary schools, two middle schools, two high schools, and two alternative education institutions, encompassed in the Rocklin Unified School District, as well as campuses of Sierra College and William Jessup University.

Infrastructure

Transportation
Interstate 80 and State Route 65 intersect in Rocklin, and historic U.S. Route 40 runs through town.  The Rocklin Amtrak station is served by Amtrak California's Capitol Corridor route.

Notable people

Brandon Aiyuk, wide receiver for the San Francisco 49ers
Johnny Davis, kickboxer
Kevin Kiley, politician
John Romero, video game developer
Logan Webb, pitcher for the San Francisco Giants
Karyn White, pop singer

References

External links
 
City of Rocklin official website Portal style website, Government, Business, Library, Recreation and more
City-Data.com Comprehensive Statistical Data and more about Rocklin

Cities in Placer County, California
Cities in Sacramento metropolitan area
Incorporated cities and towns in California
1893 establishments in California